Samuel James Hebert (March 31, 1893 – July 23, 1965) was a Canadian ice hockey goaltender. He played professionally from 1913 until 1924 in the National Hockey Association (NHA), National Hockey League (NHL) and Western Canada Hockey League (WCHL). He played for the Toronto Ontarios, Ottawa Senators, Toronto Arenas, and Saskatoon Sheiks.

Playing career
Born  in Ottawa, Ontario, Hebert played for several amateur teams in Ottawa before turning professional in 1913 with the Toronto Ontarios of the NHA. In December 1914, he returned home, traded to the Ottawa Senators for Skene Ronan. He played two games for Ottawa in the 1914–15 season before joining the military. After a year in the military, Hebert returned to professional hockey as a member of the Senators. He was part of a three-way trade with Ottawa and Montreal, ending up with the Quebec Bulldogs for the balance of the 1916–17 season. After the suspension of the NHA in 1917, Hebert signed with the Torontos of the NHL, playing two games before being traded to Ottawa for cash. He played the following seasons with amateur competition, returning to professional hockey with the Saskatoon Sheiks of the WCHL in 1921. He played two seasons with Saskatoon before rejoining the Senators in 1924, playing two final games with the Senators to end his career.

Career statistics

Regular season and playoffs

Transactions
 December 29, 1913 – Signed as a free agent by Toronto Ontarios.
 December 25, 1914 – Traded to Ottawa Senators by Toronto Ontarios/Shamrocks with cash for Skene Ronan
 December 5, 1917 – Signed as a free agent by Toronto (NHL).
 January 16, 1917 – Traded to Montreal Canadiens by Ottawa for Jack Fournier.
 January 16, 1917 – Traded to Quebec Bulldogs by Montreal Canadiens for Tommy Smith.
 January 24, 1917 – Loaned to Ottawa  by Quebec as emergency replacement for Clint Benedict (Toronto 8, Ottawa 5).
 February 11, 1918 – Traded to Ottawa by Toronto for cash.
 November 25, 1919 – Rights awarded to Quebec when team activated in NHL.
 December 2, 1921 – Signed as a free agent by Saskatoon (WCHL).
 February 1, 1922 – Transferred to Moose Jaw (WCHL) after Saskatoon franchise relocated.
 October 26, 1922 – Returned to Saskatoon after Moose Jaw franchise relocated.
 February 29, 1924 – Signed as a free agent by Ottawa.

Source:

Personal life
Sammy Hebert had a wife, two sons and a daughter as well as six grandchildren.

References

External links
 

1893 births
1965 deaths
Canadian ice hockey goaltenders
Canadian military personnel of World War I
Ice hockey people from Ottawa
Ottawa Senators (1917) players
Ottawa Senators (NHA) players
Quebec Bulldogs (NHA) players
Saskatoon Sheiks players
Toronto Arenas players
Toronto Ontarios players